Phyllostachys glauca  is a species of bamboo found in Anhui, Henan, Hunan, Jiangsu, Shaanxi, Shandong, Shanxi, Yunnan, Zhejiang provinces of China.

References

External links
 
 

glauca
Flora of China